Eric Butorac and Travis Rettenmaier were the defending champions, but they chose to not participate this year.
Rohan Bopanna and Ken Skupski won in the final 6–2, 2–6, [10–6], against Jonathan Marray and Jamie Murray.

Seeds

Draw

Draw

References
 Doubles Draw

The Jersey International - Doubles
The Jersey International